Lefevrea puncticollis is a species of leaf beetle of Zimbabwe and the Democratic Republic of the Congo. It was first described from Mashonaland by Martin Jacoby in 1897.

References 

Eumolpinae
Beetles of the Democratic Republic of the Congo
Taxa named by Martin Jacoby
Beetles described in 1897
Insects of Zimbabwe